Raymond Howard Carter (born September 12, 1972) is a British-American former professional basketball player and a former member of the English national basketball team.

College
Carter played for Central Florida from 1991 to 1993 but poor grades cost him his eligibility at UCF. He started 14 games as a freshman and 15 games as a junior, averaging 9.5 points and making 102 of 310 3-point shots during his two years at UCF. He enrolled at Valencia Community College in the spring of 1993 to repair his grade point. In 1994 Carter joined Rollins College where he graduated in 1996.

Career
Carter played for Brandt Hagen E.V. during the 1996–1997 season. He averaged 12.0 points and 4.0 assists for the club in the 1996–97 FIBA EuroCup.

Carter played for the Oberwart Gunners during the 1998–1999 season and helped them win the Austrian Cup. He left the club in January 1999 after the escalation of a dispute which began when the club deducted wages for time he spent with the English national team. In February 1999, Carter signed with KFÍ og the Úrvalsdeild karla. With Carter, KFÍ won five of their last six games and finished with the third best record in the regular season. During the playoffs, they swept Tindastóll 2–0 in the first round before bowing out against Njarðvík, 1–3, in the semi-finals.

References

External links
NCAA stats at sports-reference.com
Úrvalsdeild stats at kki.is
Úrvalsdeild playoffs stats at kki.is
Basketball Bundesliga stats at easycredit-bbl.de
FIBA Europe profile at fibaeurope.com
Profile at eurobasket.com

1972 births
Living people
American expatriate basketball people in Austria
American expatriate basketball people in Germany
American expatriate basketball people in Iceland
American men's basketball players
British expatriate basketball people in Austria
British expatriate basketball people in Germany
British expatriate basketball people in Iceland
British men's basketball players
English men's basketball players
Oberwart Gunners players
UCF Knights men's basketball players
Úrvalsdeild karla (basketball) players
Vestri men's basketball players
Guards (basketball)